Sherrie Miday (born 12 October 1976) is a judge for the Cuyahoga County Court of Common Pleas in Ohio.

Early life and career 
Sherrie was born in Cleveland two years after her parents, one of which is a Coptic priest, immigrated to the United States from Egypt. 
After completing her education, she worked as a lawyer at the Cleveland office for six years, as a prosecutor for three years, and as an assistant judge for three years. She is currently in her first term as a judge for the Cuyahoga County Court of Common Pleas in Ohio which ends in 2022.

Education 
In 1998 Miday graduated from John Carroll University. In 2001 she received her J.D. from Case Western Reserve University.

Career 
She worked as a lawyer at the Cleveland office for six years to meet the requirements for running for a judgeship. She worked for three years as a prosecutor and three years as assistant judge.

Campaigns

2014 
Miday ran for election to the Cuyahoga County Court of Common Pleas and became the first Egyptian-American to run for judge. However, she was defeated by incumbent Judge Pamela A. Barker in the general election on November 4, 2014, after receiving 47.1 percent of the vote.

2016 
In the general election, Sherrie Miday defeated Matthew McMonagle by receiving 54.07% of the votes. She ran unopposed in the Cuyahoga County Court of Common Pleas General Division Democratic primary election. With this historic win, on November 8, 2016, she became the first Egyptian-American to be elected as a judge in the United States.

See also
List of first women lawyers and judges in the United States
List of first women lawyers and judges in Ohio

References

People from Cleveland
American people of Egyptian descent
Ohio Democrats
American people of Coptic descent
Middle Eastern Christians
1976 births
Living people
American women judges
Ohio state court judges
African-American Christians
21st-century American women